Kaare Kroppan (25 April 1933 – 11 May 2014) was a Norwegian actor.

He was employed at Trøndelag Teater, Riksteatret, Rogaland Teater, Fjernsynsteatret and Den Nationale Scene during his career. In addition to being a stage actor he had film parts, among others in Kimen and Ransom (both 1974), Den sommeren jeg fylte 15 (1976), Kamilla og tyven (1988) and the television series Offshore (1996–1999). He was born in Trondheim, and died there in May 2014.

Filmography

References

1933 births
2014 deaths
Actors from Trondheim
Norwegian male stage actors
Norwegian male film actors
Norwegian male television actors